Mun Jun (Korean: 문준, Hanja: 文俊, born 14 July 1982) is a South Korean speed skater. He represented his country at the 2002 Winter Olympics in Salt Lake City. In Salt Lake City where he finished in 19th position that he broke his own record to a new best time of 1.48.58.

In his second Winter Olympics in 2006, Torino, he competed at 1000m and 1500m. He finished 24th at the 1000m and 16th at the 1500m.

Personal records
 500m — 34.43 (16 November 2007, Calgary)
 1000m — 1:07.11 (11 November 2007, Salt Lake City)
 1500m — 1:45.58 (16 November 2007, Calgary)
 3000m — 4:00.07 (3 March 2002, Ritten)
 5000m — 6:44.93 (17 November 2002, Erfurt)
 10000m — 14:42.76 (3 December 2000, Harbin)

External links
 
 
 
 
 

Living people
1982 births
South Korean male speed skaters
Olympic speed skaters of South Korea
Speed skaters at the 2002 Winter Olympics
Speed skaters at the 2006 Winter Olympics
Speed skaters at the 2010 Winter Olympics
Asian Games medalists in speed skating
Speed skaters at the 1999 Asian Winter Games
Speed skaters at the 2003 Asian Winter Games
Speed skaters at the 2007 Asian Winter Games
Asian Games silver medalists for South Korea
Asian Games bronze medalists for South Korea
Medalists at the 1999 Asian Winter Games
Medalists at the 2003 Asian Winter Games
Medalists at the 2007 Asian Winter Games